Filip Gilissen (born 1980 in Brussels, Belgium) is a Belgian artist. He has had solo exhibitions at Museum of Contemporary Art, Antwerp (MUHKA)  and Etablissement d'en Face  (Brussels). He has participated in group exhibitions at Life Sport (Athens)  Panicz (Ostend), Fotomuseum Winterthur, Bucharest Biennale, LISTE Performance Project (Basel), Witte de With Center for Contemporary Art,  Kunsthalle Nürnberg, Liverpool Biennial, and MARTa Herford. Gilissen is the co-curator of Cosmopolitanissimo.

References

External links

Sources
 

Living people
1980 births
Artists from Brussels
Digital artists
Belgian performance artists